John L. Plaster (born 1949) is a former United States Army Special Forces officer regarded as one of the leading sniper experts in the world. A decorated Vietnam War veteran who served in the covert Studies and Observations Group (SOG), Plaster co-founded a renowned sniper school that trains military and law enforcement personnel in highly specialized sniper tactics. He is the author of The Ultimate Sniper: An Advanced Training Manual for Military and Police Snipers, The History of Sniping and Sharpshooting, and Secret Commandos: Behind Enemy Lines with the Elite Warriors of SOG, a memoir of his 3 years of service with SOG.

Early life and education
Plaster graduated from high school in 1967 and holds a BA in Journalism from the University of Minnesota. He was trained as a communications sergeant in the U.S. Army Special Forces.

Career
Plaster was initially assigned to 5th Special Forces Group and served three combat tours in the Vietnam War as a member of MACVSOG beginning in October 1968, leading intelligence-gathering and recon teams in North Vietnamese Army-controlled areas of Laos and Cambodia and along the Ho Chi Minh Trail. He was wounded once, and decorated four times, eventually receiving a field commission in recognition of his combat experience. Plaster's final tour with MACVSOG ended in November 1971. He retired from the military at the rank of Major.

Plaster parlayed his military experience into becoming a sniping instructor to members of many U.S. governmental agencies such as the Federal Bureau of Investigation, the United States Customs Service, the United States Marshals, Navy SEALs, and United States Marine Corps. Foreign units that have attended the school include the Royal Canadian Mounted Police and the Spanish Foreign Legion.

Since 1993, Plaster has been a precision rifle instructor at the Gunsite Training Center in Paulden, Arizona. He was recently Chief of Competition for Autauga Arms' U.S. and European sniping championships.

Plaster's experiences serve as part of the basis for the video game Call of Duty: Black Ops; he assisted the game's developers in developing the game by providing his wartime experiences to them.

Awards and decorations
Bronze Star Medal
Purple Heart
Meritorious Service Medal
Air Medal
Army Commendation Medal
 Presidential Unit Citation
Good Conduct Medal
National Defense Service Medal
Vietnam Service Medal
Republic of Vietnam Campaign Medal
Combat Infantryman Badge

Published writings

Books
The Ultimate Sniper: An Advanced Training Manual for Military and Police Snipers (1993). Paladin Press. 
 
Secret Commandos: Behind Enemy Lines with the Elite Warriors of SOG (2004). Simon & Schuster. 
The History of Sniping and Sharpshooting (2008). Paladin Press. 
Sharpshooting in the Civil War (2009). Paladin Press. 
SOG: The Secret Wars of America's Commandos in Vietnam (1998). Onyx. 
Sniping in the Trenches: World War I and the Birth of Modern Sniping (2017). Paladin Press.

Journals
The FBI Law Enforcement Bulletin
Soldier of Fortune
American Legion Magazine
Guns & Ammo

Notes

External links

American military writers
Living people
United States Army officers
University of Minnesota School of Journalism and Mass Communication alumni
United States Army personnel of the Vietnam War
Members of the United States Army Special Forces
1949 births
Recipients of the Air Medal